Helen Rosaline Ashton Jordan  (18 October 1891 – 27 June 1958) was a British novelist, literary biographer and physician.

Life 
Helen Rosaline Ashton was born in Kensington, London, the daughter of Emma Burnie and Arthur Jacob Ashton, KC, Recorder of Manchester. Her brother was Sir Leigh Ashton, director of the Victoria and Albert Museum.

She wrote her first novel in 1913, Pierrot In Town,. During World War I, she nursed as a VAD, and over the course of the war she wrote three novels.

After the war, Ashton studied medicine, qualifying from the London Hospital in 1921 and graduating M.B., B.S. in 1922. She was then a house physician at Great Ormond Street Hospital until she married Arthur Jordan, a barrister, in 1927. After her marriage, Ashton retired from medicine but continued to write.

Over 43 years she published 26 books, which included several literary biographies, such as I Had A Sister (written with Katharine Davies in 1937 - a study of Mary Lamb, Dorothy Wordsworth, Caroline Herschel and Cassandra Austen), William and Dorothy (1938), and Parson Austen's Daughter (1949) amongst others. Her first major fictional success was Doctor Serocold (1930) in which she was able to draw upon her medical knowledge. Also included amongst her fictional works were Bricks and Mortar (1932), republished in 2004 by Persephone Books, and Yeoman's Hospital (1944), on which the 1951 film White Corridors was based.

She died at 66, on 27 June 1958 in Lechlade.

References

External links
Author profile at Persephone Books

1891 births
1958 deaths
British women novelists
20th-century British novelists
20th-century British women writers